The 1909–10 Missouri Tigers men's basketball team represented University of Missouri in the 1909–10 college basketball season. The team was led by second year head coach Guy Lowman.  The captain of the team was Frank Burress.

Missouri finished with an 8–11 record overall and a 3–7 record in the Missouri Valley Conference.  This was good enough for a 3rd-place finish in the regular season conference standings.

Schedule and results

References

Missouri
Missouri Tigers men's basketball seasons
Tiger
Tiger